The Stranger was an American television crime drama broadcast on the DuMont Television Network from June 25, 1954, to February 11, 1955. 

Robert Carroll played a mysterious man who helped those in distress. The stranger mysteriously appeared when people needed help and disappeared just as mysteriously after each problem was resolved, never taking any pay for his assistance. Some episodes relied more on video than on words, with the stranger "often having scarcely a mouthful of dialogue."

The 30-minute program aired Fridays at 9 PM. The series was produced and directed by Frank Telford, with Nelson Gidding and Carey Wilbur as writers. Most of the program's content was live, with film used for outdoor action. Carroll did his own stunts. Pharmaceuticals Inc. was the sponsor. 

Geritol, which sponsored The Stranger, cancelled it because only 23 DuMont affiliates carried the series. Geritol executives wanted to expand coverage by buying time on stations affiliated with CBS and NBC and providing kinescope recordings of episodes for those stations to show. When DuMont officials rejected that proposal, cancellation resulted.

Criticism
The Stranger was hampered by a small budget, even by 1950s standards. Later critics, such as Castleman and Podrazik (1982), cited The Stranger, among other DuMont series, as one of the reasons fewer and fewer viewers tuned into the ailing DuMont Network. 

They stated the series was, like several other DuMont programs during the 1953-1954 season, "doomed from the start by third-rate scripts and cheap production" and called the program a "stale pulp adventure". The series did not last long, and the network itself began crumbling by early 1955.

Episode status
Two episodes from 1954 exist at UCLA: The Build Up from September 24 and The Biter Bit from November 12.

See also
List of programs broadcast by the DuMont Television Network
List of surviving DuMont Television Network broadcasts
1954-55 United States network television schedule

References

Bibliography
David Weinstein, The Forgotten Network: DuMont and the Birth of American Television (Philadelphia: Temple University Press, 2004)

External links

DuMont historical website

DuMont Television Network original programming
1954 American television series debuts
1955 American television series endings
1950s American drama television series
Black-and-white American television shows